Tame is a town and municipality in the Arauca Department, Colombia.

History 
The region was explored by the German conquistador Jorge de Espira in 1536. There he encountered several Indian tribes from the Arawakan and the Goajiboan language families; Arauca, Caquetio, Lucalia, Girara, Chiricoa, Cuiba, Guahibo and Achagua. The Girara people lived at the exact location of the modern town (or closest to).

Tame was founded by Alonso Pérez de Guzmán on June 12, 1628. He also founded "Espinosa de las Palmas" nearby, for civilian Spaniards. The village was destroyed a few years later by the natives in confrontations in which Pérez de Guzmán and his soldiers were killed by the Girara Indians of Tame in revenge for the slavery treatment.

Geography 
The municipality of Arauca borders to the north with the municipality of Fortul, to the northeast with the municipality of Arauquita, to the east with the municipality of Puerto Rondón, to the south with the Casanare Department and to the west with the Boyacá Department.

Climate
Tame has a tropical monsoon climate (Köppen Am) with moderate to little rainfall from December to March and heavy to very heavy rainfall from April to November.

References

External links 

  Tame official website

Municipalities of Arauca Department